The Australian stock saddle is a saddle in popular use all over the world for activities that require long hours in the saddle and a secure seat. The saddle is suitable for cattle work, starting young horses, everyday pleasure riding, trail riding, endurance riding, polocrosse and is also used in Australian campdrafting competitions and stockman challenges.

The traditional Australian stock saddle was designed for security and comfort in the saddle no matter how harsh the conditions. While having stylistic roots from the English saddle in the design of the seat, panels, fenders, and stirrups, it has a much deeper seat, higher cantle, and knee pads in the front to create a very secure saddle for riders who ride in rough conditions or spend long hours on a horse.

The saddle is kept on with a girth attached to billets under the flaps, similar to those on a dressage saddle. A surcingle passing over the seat of the saddle is also used to provide additional safety. The rear of the saddle is sometimes secured by a crupper. A breastcollar is sometimes added.  A saddle blanket or numnah is used under the saddle to absorb sweat and to protect the back of the horse.

History
Initially the stock saddle was a "park" style saddle similar to the modern English showing saddle, with low set knee rolls and short flaps.  However, this style of saddle did not suit the rugged Australian terrain and did little protect the rider’s legs from sweat. Thus the flaps were lengthened, thigh and knee pads added, the seat deepened and the cantle raised.  A saddlemaker named Jack Wieneke developed a design that was popular for a number of years, but the design over time became too extreme and lost favour to more conservative styles.

During the early days of buckjumping in Australian rodeos, riders rode in a modified stock saddle using a crupper instead of the "flank cinch" used in the USA. Ladies' stock saddles were traditionally made with a pigskin seat and with longer, pigskin covered knee and thigh pads.

Current design
Modern styles range from traditional models through to a newer "half breed" that incorporates the independent swinging fender and stirrup style of the western saddle with the traditional Australian tree and seat style.  There are also "cross breed" saddles that combine other western saddle elements, such as a saddle horn or a western cantle design, with traditional Australian elements, such as the pommel swells and deep seat.

Comparison with other styles
The Australian saddle combines some features of both English and Western saddles. The Australian saddle allows riders to be able to move with the horse over difficult terrain. The added “knee pads” help to keep the rider in the saddle, as do the high cantle and pommel. The stirrup position on the Australian saddle is a little more forward than in a western saddle and the seat positions the legs in front of the body. This makes the saddle comfortable for long hours of riding and for riding in tough terrain.  One of the issues with the Australian stock saddle is the stirrup leathers,  as the leathers lie on the outside of the flap and against the leg. If not wide enough, the leg can get pinched.  Some new designs, such as the "swinging fender", that incorporates the western-style stirrup leather, have attempted to address this issue.  Some saddles, particularly some designs sold in the United States also add a western-style saddle horn, though this is not a traditional element of the Australian saddle.

References
Outback magazine, Aug/Sep 2007 – pp 28–44

External links
https://web.archive.org/web/20071016201203/http://jamessaddlery.com.au/history.htm
 Parts of the Australian stock saddle
http://www.mathewmurray.com.au/how-traditional-stock-saddles-have-evolved-to-suit-australian-conditions/

Saddles
Australian inventions